Madog Fychan was a member of the family of Princes of Powys Fadog, though he never gained the title, being brother of Gruffydd Maelor II. He was an ally to Dafydd ap Llywelyn in his campaign to attack English possessions in Wales in 1245 and sided with Llywelyn ap Gruffydd in 1258 in his claim to the title of Prince of Wales. He died in December 1269.

Ancestry and Ambiguity 
Some sources cite Madog Fychan ap Madog ap Gruffydd, also known as Madog Fychan, as the brother of Gruffydd Maelor II and grandson of Gruffydd Maelor I, Prince of Powys Fadog, existing c.1230–1269. Other genealogical tables insert another generation lower down with Madog Fychan as son of Madog Crypl (c. 1275–1304/6). However, it is more likely that Madog Crypl's son was Gruffydd, who was succeeded by Gruffydd Fychan II, the father of Owain Glyndŵr.

References
Sewell genealogy
Welsh Princes
J. E. Lloyd, Owen Glendower: Owen Glyn Dŵr (Clarendon Press, Oxford, 1931), 9-17 (not mentioned).
https://biography.wales/article/s-MADO-FYC-1269
A History of Wales: from the Earliest Times to the Edwardian Conquest
Littere Wallie, 1940  

14th-century rulers in Europe
Monarchs of Powys